Lupus Protospatharius Barensis was the reputed author of the Chronicon rerum in regno Neapolitano gestarum (also called Annales Lupi Protospatharii), a concise history of the Mezzogiorno from 805 to 1102. He has only been named as the author since the seventeenth century. Lupus, along with two other Bariot chronicles, the Annales barenses and the Anonymi Barensis Chronicon, used some lost ancient annals of Bari up to 1051. William of Apulia appears to have used these same annals. Lupus also used the lost annals of Matera. Perhaps most unusual to Lupus is his dating method. He began his years in September and so places events of the latter half of a given year in the next year.

References

External links
 Lupus Protospatarius Barensis, Rerum in Regno Neapolitano Gestarum Breve Chronicon ab Anno Sal. 860 vsque ad 1102. at The Latin Library.

Italian chroniclers
12th-century Italian historians
12th-century Latin writers